Tashan Rural District is in Riz District of Jam County, Bushehr province, Iran. At the census of 2006, its population was 3,349 in 727 households; there were 3,700 inhabitants in 906 households at the following census of 2011; and in the most recent census of 2016, the population of the rural district was 4,031 in 1,125 households. The largest of its 13 villages was Tashan, with 1,234 people.

References 

Rural Districts of Bushehr Province
Populated places in Jam County